Maryland Route 509 (MD 509) is a state highway in the U.S. state of Maryland.  Known for most of its length as Governor Run Road, the state highway runs  from MD 2/MD 4 east to a dead end at the Chesapeake Bay within Port Republic. MD 509 was constructed east from what is now MD 765 in the early 1930s. The highway was extended west to MD 2/MD 4 in the early 1980s.

Route description

MD 509 begins at an intersection with Solomons Island Road, a four-lane divided highway that carries the concurrency of MD 2/MD 4, in Port Republic. The state highway heads north along an unnamed two-lane undivided road to MD 765 (St. Leonard Road). The two state highways run concurrently southeast along St. Leonard Road for a short distance before MD 509 splits east onto Governor Run Road. The highway heads east as a two-lane undivided road through a forested area split by a trio of transmission lines that extend north from the Calvert Cliffs Nuclear Power Plant. Near its eastern terminus, MD 509 intersects Kenwood Beach Road, which serves the beach community of Kenwood Beach. After crossing Governor Run, the state highway reaches its eastern terminus at a dead end just west of the Chesapeake Bay shoreline.

Though the portion of the highway between MD 2/MD 4 and the St. Leonard Road/Governor Run Road intersection is signed MD 509, it is officially designated MD 765B and MD 765 by the MDSHA.

History
MD 509 was constructed east from MD 2 (now MD 765) to the bay by 1933. The MD 2/MD 4 divided highway was constructed around 1981; the western extension of MD 509 was built by 1985.

Junction list

See also

References

External links

MDRoads: MD 509

509
Maryland Route 509